This is a list of diplomatic missions of Burkina Faso, excluding honorary consulates.

Africa

 Algiers (Embassy)

 Cotonou (Consulate-General)

 N'Djamena (Embassy)

 Cairo (Embassy)

 Addis Ababa (Embassy)

 Libreville (Embassy)

 Accra (Embassy)
 Kumasi (Consulate-General)

 Abidjan (Embassy)
 Bouaké (Consulate-General)
 Soubré (Consulate-General)

 Nairobi (Embassy)

 Tripoli (Embassy)

 Bamako (Embassy)
 Ségou (Consulate-General)

 Rabat (Embassy)

 Niamey (Consulate-General)

 Abuja (Embassy)
 Lagos (Consulate-General)

 Dakar (Embassy)

 Pretoria (Embassy)

 Lomé (Consulate-General)

 Tunis (Embassy)

America

 Brasilia (Embassy)

 Ottawa (Embassy)

 Havana (Embassy)

 Washington, D.C. (Embassy)

Asia

 Beijing (Embassy)

 New Delhi (Embassy)

 Tokyo (Embassy)

 Kuwait City (Embassy)

 Doha (Embassy)

 Riyadh (Embassy)
 Jeddah (Consulate-General)

 Ankara (Embassy)

 Abu Dhabi (Embassy)

Europe

 Vienna (Embassy)

 Brussels (Embassy)

 Copenhagen (Embassy)

 Paris (Embassy)

 Berlin (Embassy)

 Rome (Embassy)

 Rome (Embassy)

 Moscow (Embassy)

 Geneva (Embassy)

Multilateral organisations
African Union
Addis Ababa (Permanent Mission to the African Union)

Geneva (Permanent Mission to the United Nations and other international organisations)
New York City (Permanent Mission to the United Nations)

Gallery

See also
 Foreign relations of Burkina Faso
 List of diplomatic missions in Burkina Faso
 Visa policy of Burkina Faso
 Visa requirements for Burkinabe citizens

Notes

References

 Ministry of Foreign Affairs of Burkina Faso

 
Diplomatic missions
Burkina Faso